Cracroft may refer to:
 Cracroft, New Zealand, a suburb of Christchurch, New Zealand
 Cracroft Caverns, a series of large chambers in Christchurch's Port Hills
 Cracroft, British Columbia, locality at the east end of Forward Bay on the south side of West Cracroft Island in the Johnstone Strait region of the Central Coast of British Columbia, Canada
 Cracroft Islands, islands in the Johnstone Strait region of the Central Coast of British Columbia, Canada
 West Cracroft Island, the larger of the two Cracroft Islands
Cracroft Point is the headland at the western tip of West Cracroft Island
 East Cracroft Island, the smaller of the two Cracroft Islands
 Cracroft (name), a surname and, less commonly, given name